Headin' for Trouble is a 1931 American pre-Code Western film directed by J.P. McGowan and starring Bob Custer, Betty Mack and John Ince.

Main cast
 Bob Custer as Cyclone Crosby 
 Betty Mack as Mary Courtney 
 John Ince as Poker Slade 
 Buck Connors as John Courtney 
 Andy Shuford as Bobbie Courtney 
 Robert D. Walker as Butch Morgan - Henchman
 Duke R. Lee as Andrews - Henchman

Plot
After Crosby intervenes to protect Courtney from Morgan's unwanted advanced, her father asks Crosby to stay around. Crosby sets a trap for the outlaws, and afterward he is revealed to be a ranger working undercover.

References

Bibliography
 Michael R. Pitts. Poverty Row Studios, 1929–1940: An Illustrated History of 55 Independent Film Companies, with a Filmography for Each. McFarland & Company, 2005.

External links
 

1931 films
1931 Western (genre) films
American Western (genre) films
Films directed by J. P. McGowan
1930s English-language films
1930s American films